"If I'm Lucky" is a song by American singer and songwriter Jason Derulo, released on September 1, 2017. The song was written by Derulo and Justin Tranter, while the production was handled by Mattman & Robin.

Background and release
While talking about the song in an interview with Billboard, Derulo said; "I love the emotional feeling bursting. The effect of the echo, it kind of sounds like I’m in an empty room. I think it sounds like nothing else I write. It’s an emotional song that you can dance to. And the subject matter I think is really cool, it’s one that has never been talked about -- having a love that fails in this life, but it was a love that was so good that maybe the love will work in the next life.". The official lyric video for "If I'm Lucky" was uploaded to Derulo's YouTube channel on September 1, 2017. It was inspired by Michael Jackson's "Thriller" music video and features Derulo dancing with zombie dancers.

Music video
The music video for "If I'm Lucky" was directed by Hannah Lux Davis. On September 20, 2017, the video's trailer was uploaded to Derulo's YouTube channel. The full video premiered on September 22.

Live performances
Derulo performed the song live for the first time on the Good Morning America show on September 1, 2017 and later performed it on Sounds Like Friday Night on October 27, 2017.

Charts

Certifications

References

External links
 
 

2017 singles
2017 songs
Jason Derulo songs
Music videos directed by Hannah Lux Davis
Songs written by Jason Derulo
Songs written by Justin Tranter
Song recordings produced by Mattman & Robin
Songs written by Mattias Larsson
Songs written by Robin Fredriksson
Warner Records singles